Night Convoy is a 1932 German drama film directed by James Bauer and starring Vladimir Gajdarov, Olga Tschechowa and Oskar Homolka. It was shot at the Babelsberg Studios in Berlin and on location in Hamburg. The film's sets were designed by the art directors Willi Herrmann and Herbert O. Phillips. It premiered on 21 January 1932.

Cast 

 Vladimir Gajdarov as Mario Orbeliani
 Olga Tschechowa as Inka Maria, seine Frau
 Oskar Homolka as André Carno
 Wolfgang Lohmeyer as Jascha, deren Sohn
 Trude Berliner as Spielklarissa
 Hermann Speelmans as Banjospieler
 Julius Falkenstein as Der 'Professor'
 Käthe Haack as Frau Marquardt
 Hannele Meierzak as Christel, ihre Tochter
 Ludwig Stössel
 Hans Leibelt
 Bernhard Goetzke
 Gyula Szőreghy
 Paul Rehkopf

References

Bibliography
 
 Klaus, Ulrich J. Deutsche Tonfilme: Jahrgang 1932. Klaus-Archiv, 1988.

External links

1932 films
Films of the Weimar Republic
1932 drama films
German drama films
1930s German-language films
Films directed by James Bauer
German black-and-white films
1930s German films
Films shot at Babelsberg Studios
Films shot in Hamburg